Matthieu Gianni (born January 2, 1985 in Bastia) is a French professional football player, who currently plays for Sainte Lucie Football Club of Corsica.

Career
Gianni played eight games in the Ligue 2 for Grenoble Foot 38 and twenty five in the Championnat de France amateur for US Le Pontet.

International career
Gianni is member of the unofficial Corsica national football team.

Notess

1985 births
Living people
French footballers
Ligue 2 players
Grenoble Foot 38 players
US Pontet Grand Avignon 84 players
Association football midfielders